Pandamaran is a state constituency in Selangor, Malaysia, that has been represented in the Selangor State Legislative Assembly from 1986 to 1995, from 2004 to present.

The state constituency was created in the 1984 redistribution and is mandated to return a single member to the Selangor State Legislative Assembly under the first past the post voting system.

Demographics

History
It was abolished in 1995 when it was redistributed. It was re-created in 2004.

According to the federal gazette issued on 30 March 2018, the Pandamaran constituency is divided into 23 polling districts.

Representation history

Election results

References

Selangor state constituencies